Beauty Shop is a 2005 American comedy film directed by Bille Woodruff. The film serves as a spin-off of the Barbershop film franchise, and stars Queen Latifah as Gina, a character first introduced in the 2004 film Barbershop 2: Back in Business. This film also stars Alicia Silverstone, Andie MacDowell, Mena Suvari, Kevin Bacon and Djimon Hounsou.

Released theatrically in the United States by Metro-Goldwyn-Mayer on March 30, 2005, Beauty Shop received generally mixed reviews from critics. The film has grossed $37.2 million worldwide against a $25 million production budget.

Plot
Widowed hairstylist Gina Norris has moved to Atlanta so her daughter Vanessa can attend a private music school. After a disagreement with her domineering Austrian boss, Jorge, she quits and sets up her own shop, purchasing a run-down salon with the help of a loan officer. At the shop, the staff often listen to their favorite radio talk-show host, DJ Hollerin' Helen.

Gina discovers that taking over the salon comes with complications: loudmouthed young stylists, demanding clients, and her own lack of an established reputation in Atlanta. Lynn, the only white stylist at the salon, has trouble fitting in, especially with Chanel, another stylist. A flirtatious young man, Willie, hangs around filming things and chatting up the women at the salon, including Vanessa. When Gina's rebellious sister-in-law Darnelle gets into legal trouble with her lowlife boyfriend, Gina has to bail her out of jail. She has Darnelle work at the shop to pay her back, and gives Darnelle an ultimatum to clean up her act and pay back Gina's money or face eviction. 

Gina's styling skills and customer handling win over the salon's clientele, and many customers from Jorge's salon begin going to hers instead. Jorge retaliates by bribing a corrupt inspector to try to shut down Gina's salon with spurious violations. When electrical issues arise, Gina finds that the upstairs renter, Joe, is a handsome electrician from Africa. He bonds with Vanessa over their love of piano, and he and Gina also become close. 

Gina develops a homemade "miracle" hair conditioner. A satisfied client, Joanne, arranges for a meeting at cosmetics company CoverGirl so that Gina can sell them the formula. She hires a male stylist, James, after he comes into the shop and demonstrates his skill with braids. Darnelle's boyfriend confronts her at the salon, and Gina and James step in to protect her.

The salon staff go to a night club to party. James and Lynn fall for one another after dancing and kissing. Gina and Joe develop their relationship as well. At the salon, Joanne flirts with James and blows up when Lynn asks her not to. Chanel unexpectedly stands up for Lynn, and Joanne demands that Gina fire them. Gina refuses and Joanne cancels the meeting with CoverGirl. Lynn feels guilty, but Gina tells her that it isn't her fault.

The shop is trashed and vandalized the night before Vanessa's big piano recital, but the staff come together to clean up the mess, even bringing in their own supplies to make sure the salon can stay open. Darnelle decides it's time for her to grow up and enrolls in beauty school. Willie secretly tapes Jorge and Inspector Crawford discussing their scheme to ruin Gina. 

A disheveled woman enters the shop and begs someone to fix her hair for a wedding that day. Willie shows Gina the videotape of Jorge and Inspector Crawford. That night, Gina confronts Jorge at his salon and threatens to expose his scheme, as well as the fact that he is actually from Nebraska, not Austria, and tells him she will never give up. Jorge continues to insult Gina as she leaves, and James and his friends humiliate him by giving him an extreme haircut.

Later, as Gina and the shop listen to Hollerin' Helen's show, she gives a shout-out to Gina's salon and her miracle conditioner, and they realize she was the desperate woman on the way to the wedding.

Cast
Queen Latifah as Gina Norris
Djimon Hounsou as Joe 
Alicia Silverstone as Lynn
Alfre Woodard as Ms. Josephine
Sherri Shepherd as Ida
Golden Brooks as Chanel
Bryce Wilson as James
Kevin Bacon as Jorge Christophe
Keshia Knight Pulliam as Darnelle
Andie MacDowell as Terri
Mena Suvari as Joanne Marcus
Paige Hurd as Vanessa Norris
Laura Hayes as Paulette
Lil' JJ as Willie
 Omari Hardwick as Byron
Adele Givens as Hollerin' Helen
Sheryl Underwood as Catfish Rita
Jim Holmes as Inspector Crawford
LisaRaye McCoy as Rochelle
Kimora Lee Simmons as Denise
Della Reese as Mrs. Towner
Joyful Drake as Mercedes
Tawny Dahl as Porsche
Andrew Levitas as Stacy
Octavia Spencer as Ida
Birdman as Glen
Wilmer Valderrama as Corky
Reagan Gomez-Preston as Chelsea
Ki Toy Johnson as Debbie
Nancy Lenehan as Mrs. Struggs

Reception
On Rotten Tomatoes, the film holds an approval rating of 38%, based on reviews from 119 critics, with an average score of 5.35/10. The site's critics consensus reads: "Despite a strong performance by Queen Latifah, Beauty Shop is in need of some style pointers." On Metacritic, the film has a weighted average score of 53 rating, based on 28 critics, indicating "mixed or average reviews". Audiences surveyed by CinemaScore gave the film a grade A− on scale of A to F.

Claudia Puig of USA Today wrote "Overall, the parts don't come together and jell as well as they did in the Barbershop films".

Jennifer Frey of The Washington Post praised lead actress, Queen Latifah, for being herself.

Ruthe Stein of the San Francisco Chronicle said that "[actress] Alfre Woodard shows she's as adept at comedy as drama".

Derek Armstrong of AllMovie gave the film three out of five stars, stating that while the film sticks to the same formula which made the Barbershop films so successful, it still "bursts with life, having attracted a spectrum of enthusiastic performers and a script that exceeds broad character types."

Awards and nominations 

2005 BET Comedy Awards
Outstanding Directing for a Theatrical Film—Bille Woodruff (nominated)
Outstanding Lead Actress in a Theatrical Film—Queen Latifah (nominated)
Outstanding Theatrical Film (nominated)
Outstanding Writing for a Theatrical Film—Audrey Wells, Kate Lanier, Norman Vance Jr. (nominated)

2005 Black Movie Awards
Outstanding Achievement in Writing—Kate Lanier, Norman Vance Jr. (nominated)
Outstanding Performance by an Actress in a Leading Role—Queen Latifah (nominated)

2005 Teen Choice Awards
Choice Movie Actress: Comedy—Queen Latifah (nominated)
Choice Movie: Hissy Fit—Queen Latifah (nominated)
Choice Movie: Sleazebag—Kevin Bacon (nominated)
Choice Movie: Rap Artist—Queen Latifah (nominated)

2006 Black Reel Awards
Best Actress—Queen Latifah (nominated)

2006 NAACP Image Awards
Outstanding Actress in a Motion Picture—Queen Latifah (nominated)

References

External links

Barbershop (franchise)
2005 comedy films
African-American comedy films
American sequel films
Films about hairdressers
Film spin-offs
Films directed by Bille Woodruff
Films produced by Robert Teitel
Films scored by Christopher Young
Films shot in Atlanta
Films set in Atlanta
Films shot in Georgia (U.S. state)
Mandeville Films films
Metro-Goldwyn-Mayer films
Films produced by David Hoberman
2000s English-language films
2000s American films